The Universidad del Mar «UMAR» is a public institution of higher education and scientific research of the Government of the State of Oaxaca, Mexico, with the support and recognition of the Federal Government, it belongs to the Oaxaca State University System (OSUS), it has three university campuses: Puerto Angel, Puerto Escondido and Huatulco and a Center of Tourist Training (CECAT). Its main functions are: teaching, research, cultural diffusion and promoting development.

UMAR was founded in 1992 at the request of the governor of Oaxaca, Heladio Ramírez López. It was designed and executed by Dr. Modesto Seara Vázquez, rector of the university.

The Universidad del Mar has positioned itself as one of the best universities in the country and proof of this has been the results achieved in the last thirteen years, where the bachelor's degrees in Tourism Administration and International Relations have obtained the first places in the CENEVAL knowledge test.

Objectives of this university model 
To decentralize higher education:

To avoid the concentration of academic and scientific resources in areas that are becoming disproportionately strong and increasingly differentiated from the rest of the country.

To prevent the human decapitalization of the most disadvantaged regions, which due to the lack of educational opportunities, the communities see young generations leave at an early age that facilitates their permanent uprooting, due to the emotional and sentimental ties and interests that are produced in the place of residence, and which makes their recovery practically impossible.

To improve knowledge of the economic resources of the concerned region, in order to lay the foundations for sound economic and social development.

To train social leaders in the public and private spheres.

To introduce a professional elite into a society that lacks one, to serve as a catalyst for transformation.

To improve the cultural competitiveness of the area of influence of the respective university, by combining the reception of ideas and modernizing concepts, with the conservation and reinforcement of the own values.

To contribute, in a globalized world, to the competitiveness of the economy of Oaxaca and Mexico, seeking the highest standards of quality in teaching and research, without any kind of absurd inferiority complex.

Motto 
The motto Mare Nostrum Veritabile Faciendum (written in Latin) means "Let us truly make the sea ours".

Governing bodies 

Rector, who is the highest university authority, and is appointed or removed by the Governor of Oaxaca.
 Academic vice-rector and administrative vice-rector, appointed by the rector.
 Vice-rector for Relations and Resources, also appointed by the rector. They have only been appointed for the Universidad Tecnológica de la Mixteca and Universidad del Mar, which are respectively in charge of the SUNEO offices in Mexico City and Oaxaca.
 Head of department and directors of research institutes, as well as the heads of the postgraduate studies. They are appointed by the rector.

Academics 
UMAR offers 16 undergraduate programs in addition to 11 postgraduate studies.

Bachelor's degrees

 Actuarial Studies - Huatulco campus
 Animal Science - Puerto Escondido Campus
 Aquaculture Engineering - Puerto Ángel Campus
 Biology - Puerto Escondido Campus
 Communication Sciences - Huatulco Campus
 Economics - Huatulco Campus
 Environmental Engineering - Puerto Ángel Campus
 Fishing Engineering- Puerto Ángel Campus
 Forestry Engineering - Puerto Escondido Campus
 Informatics – Puerto Escondido Campus
 International Relations - Huatulco Campus
 Marine Biology - Puerto Ángel Campus
 Maritime Sciences - Puerto Ángel Campus
 Nursing - Puerto Escondido Campus
 Oceanology - Puerto Ángel Campus
 Tourism Administration - Huatulco Campus

Postgraduate Studies

Masters

 Animal Production and Health - Puerto Escondido Campus
 Environmental Sciences - Puerto Ángel Campus
 International Criminal Law - Huatulco Campus
 International Relations: Environment - Huatulco Campus
 Science: Genetics of Biodiversity - Puerto Escondido Campus
 Science: Marine Ecology - Puerto Ángel Campus
 Science: Wildlife Management  - Puerto Escondido Campus
 Tourism Marketing - Huatulco Campus

Doctorates

 Animal Production -  Puerto Escondido Campus
 Environmental Sciences - Puerto Escondido Campus
 Marine Ecology - Puerto Ángel Campus

Infraestructure 
UMAR has forty laboratories, for example:

 Aquaculture - Puerto Ángel Campus
 Phycotoxin Analysis (Larvatron) - Puerto Ángel Campus
 Food Analysis and Technology - Puerto Ángel Campus
 Mass Calculation - Puerto Ángel Campus
 Biological Collections - Puerto Escondido Campus
 Coastal Dynamics - Puerto Ángel Campus
 Teaching Biological Oceanography - Puerto Ángel Campus
 Teaching Physical Oceanography - Puerto Ángel Campus
 Teaching Geological Oceanography - Puerto Ángel Campus
 Ecology of the Bentos - Puerto Ángel Campus
 Histology - Puerto Ángel Campus
 Ichthyology and Fisheries Biology - Puerto Ángel Campus
 Environmental Engineering - Puerto Ángel Campus
 Research in Chemistry and Biology - Puerto Ángel Campus
 Genetic Research - Puerto Ángel Campus
 Microbiology - Puerto Escondido Campus
 Chemical Oceanography - Puerto Ángel Campus
 Geographic Information Systems and Remote Sensing - Puerto Ángel Campus
 Systematic of Marine Invertebrates -Campus Puerto Ángel
 Microalgae Technology -Campus Puerto Ángel

Research 
UMAR has 9 Research Institutes

Communication Sciences - Huatulco Campus
 Social Sciences and Humanities - Puerto Ángel Campus
 Ecology -Campus Puerto Escondido and Puerto Ángel Campus
 Economic Studies - Huatulco Campus
 International Studies Isidro Fabela - Huatulco Campus
 Genetics -Campus Puerto Escondido and Puerto Ángel Campus
 Industries -Campus Puerto Escondido and Puerto Ángel Campus
 Resources -Campus Puerto Escondido and Puerto Ángel Campus
 Tourism - Huatulco Campus

Publications 
Books

The Decisive Hour. Seara Vázquez, Modesto. 2018. 330pp.

Corporaciones Multinacionales. Una mirada a Oaxaca. Lozano Vázquez, Alberto, Marco Antonio Guadarrama Vega, Saúl Mendoza Palacios, Carlos Gabriel Argüelles Arredondo (Coord.). 2017. 330 pp.

La Vuelta al Mundo en 80 años. Seara Vázquez, Modesto. 2016. 433pp.

Los puertos de España y México. González Laxe, Fernando and  Ojeda Cárdenas, Juan N. (Coord.). 2013. 318pp.

Después de la Tragedia. A 70 años de la Segunda Guerra Mundial. Seara Vázquez, Modesto and  Lozano Vázquez, Alberto (Coord.). 2015. 806pp.

DDT Mitos y Realidades. Hernández Carlo, Beatriz and Martha E. Alcántara Garduño. 2012. 230pp.

Aves del Jardín Botánico. Bojorges B. José C. 2012. 92pp.

La Sociedad Internacional Amorfa. Soluciones inadecuadas para problemas complejos. Seara Vázquez, Modesto (coord.). 2011. 654pp.

La iguana negra. Fundamentos de reproducción, nutrición y su manejo en cautiverio. Arcos García, José Luis and Roberto López Pozos.  2009. 164pp.

Diagnóstico de los Recursos Naturales de la Bahía y Micro-cuenca de Cacaluta. Domínguez Licona, Juan Manuel (Ed.). 2008. 453pp.

Rusia hacia la Cuenca del Pacífico. 2007. Roldán, Eduardo (Ed.). 355pp.

La política exterior de México durante la Segunda Guerra Mundial. Velázquez Flores, Rafael. 2007. 205pp.

Atlas de corales pétreos (Anthozoa: Scleractinia) del Pacífico mexicano. Reyes Bonilla, Héctor, et al. 2005. 124pp.

Factores, bases y fundamentos de la política exterior de México. Velázquez Flores, Rafael. 2005. 332pp.

Estudio de Ordenamiento Ecológico para la Zona Costera del Istmo de Tehuantepec. Serrano Guzmán, Saúl J. (coord.). 2004. 159pp.

Mujeres Empresarias y Turismo en la Costa Oaxaqueña. Informe Diagnóstico y Directorio. Fernández Aldecua, María José and Pascal Barradas Salas. 2001. 81pp.

Biología y aprovechamiento del camarón Duende Streptocephalus (Crustacea-branchiopoda). Castrejón Ocampo, Laura. 1993. 72pp.

Diagramas prácticos para la acuicultura. Porras Díaz, Demetrio and Laura Castrejón Ocampo. Cuadernos 1. 1993. 111pp.

Mezcal. Moctezuma, Isidro. 2018. 113pp.

Journal

Ciencia y Mar. Published quarterly since 1997

External links 
Official page of the university: http://www.umar.mx/nuestrauniversidad_eng.html

References

Universities and colleges in Oaxaca
Educational institutions established in 1991
1991 establishments in Mexico